Maria Andreyevna Mironova (born 28 May 1973) is a Soviet and Russian actress. People's Artist of Russia (2020).

Biography
Mironova was born on 28 May 1973 in Moscow, to actors Andrei Mironov and Ekaterina Gradova. After graduating from school, she entered The Vakhtangov Theatre Academy. In 1992, Mironova gave birth to a son, Andrei. In 1993, she turned to Gerasimov Institute of Cinematography. Since 1997, Mironova has been working in the Lenkom Theatre. Divorced since 2003.

Honours
She received the title of Meritorious Artist of the Russian Federation in April 2007. In April 2007 she also received the national "Golden Mask" theatre award in the  Best Actress category for her performance as Phaedra in the play Phaedra: Golden Braid.

Selected filmography
 The Wedding (2000)
 Tycoon (2002)
 Night Watch (2004)
 The State Counsellor (2005)
 The Fall of the Empire (2005)
 Space Race (TV series) (2005)
 Day Watch (2006)
 Earthquake (2016)
 Salyut 7 (2017)
 Loud Connection (2019)
 The Courier (2020)

References

External links
 Official site of Maria Mironova

1973 births
Living people
Soviet child actresses
Russian child actresses
Soviet film actresses
Russian film actresses
Actresses from Moscow
Honored Artists of the Russian Federation
Academicians of the Russian Academy of Cinema Arts and Sciences "Nika"
20th-century Russian actresses
21st-century Russian actresses